The MP-445 Varjag (MP-445 "Варяг") is a semi-automatic pistol manufactured in Russia by the Izhevsk Mechanical Plant.

History 
By the end of the 20th century, it became obvious that pistols were an integral part of a combat unit because of their small, easy to operate size and the ease with which they could be concealed for operations where blatant displays of firepower were politically unsavory. To meet the new demand for combat handguns, Izhevsk Mechanical Plant developed a series of pistol in various calibers.

In November 2000 one MP-445 pistol was presented at "INTERPOLITEX-2000" Arms exhibition in Moscow, and it was offered for export.

The pistol is available in two models, the larger and heavier MP-445 (210 x 142 x 38mm) and the compact MP-445C (188 x 132 x 38mm). The MP-445 model has fully adjustable sights zeroed for both elevation and windage, while MP-445C has fixed, iron sights. It holds 15 rounds and readily accepts tactical flashlights and laser aiming devices. Like its predecessor the MP-444, the 445 features a frame made from super strong thermosetting plastic material.

Variants 
 MP-445 (MP-445 "Варяг") - 9×19mm Parabellum pistol
 МР-445SW - .40 S&W variant
 MP-445C (MP-445С) - 9×19mm Parabellum pistol
 МР-445CSW - .40 S&W variant

Museum exhibits 
 one MP-445C pistol is in collection of M. T. Kalashnikov Museum in Izhevsk

References 

Semi-automatic pistols of Russia
9mm Parabellum semi-automatic pistols
.40 S&W semi-automatic pistols
Trial and research firearms of Russia
Izhevsk Mechanical Plant products